Wabash is an unincorporated community in Phillips County, Arkansas, United States. Wabash has a post office with ZIP code 72389.

References

Unincorporated communities in Phillips County, Arkansas
Unincorporated communities in Arkansas
Arkansas placenames of Native American origin